State Road 729 (SR 729), locally known as State Market Road, is a  north–south road bypassing the city of Pahokee on the southeastern shore of Lake Okeechobee. SR 729 is entirely within the city limits of Pahokee and serves as a designated truck bypass for U.S. Routes 98 and 441 (US 98/US 441).

Route description
As motorists driving northbound on US 98/US 441/SR 15 veer to the west onto East Seventh Street and north onto Lake Avenue to go into downtown Pahokee, SR 729 continues alongside Florida East Coast Railroad tracks to the northeast and north through the outskirt farmlands of Pahokee, to reconnect with US 98/441/SR 15, which continues along the shore of Lake Okeechobee as Everglades Street.

History
The route was originally signed as State Road 15A.

Major intersections

References

External links

729
729